San Ignacio Hospital may refer to:

Hospital Universitario San Ignacio (HUSI), Colombia
San Ignacio Hospital (Belize)